Samuel Colliber (fl. 1718–1737) was an English writer, a lay author on theological and naval matters. John Knox Laughton suggested he was a Royal Navy volunteer or schoolmaster.

Works
Colliber published in 1727 Columna Rostrata, a naval history with significant coverage of the Anglo-Dutch wars of the 17th century. It took account of Dutch and French sources. A second edition was published in 1742.

Colliber wrote also a number of religious tracts, including:

 An Impartial Enquiry into the Existence and Nature of God (1718, 230 pp.), citing Pierre Poiret and Herman Alexander Röell among other Cartesian thinkers, and which ran through several editions; 
 The Christian Religion Founded on Reason (1729);
 Free Thoughts concerning Souls (1734), citing Spinoza; and 
 The Known God, or the Author of Nature unveiled (1737).

Colliber took up the ideas of Samuel Clarke on the existence of God, and his modifications influenced Edmund Law. Joseph Priestley cited Colliber against Cartesian plenism.

Notes

Attribution

Year of birth missing
1737 deaths
18th-century English non-fiction writers
18th-century English male writers
18th-century English writers
English philosophers